Ivan Mikhailovich Talanov (10 November 1910 – 11 July 1991) was a Soviet Russian football player, coach and a referee.

External links
 

1910 births
Sportspeople from Nizhny Novgorod
1991 deaths
Soviet bandy players
Soviet footballers
FC Zenit Saint Petersburg players
Soviet football managers
FC Zenit Saint Petersburg managers
Soviet football referees
Association football forwards
Soviet ice hockey coaches
Recipients of the Order of the Red Star
Lesgaft National State University of Physical Education, Sport and Health alumni
Soviet prisoners of war